Iolaus aethria, Karsch's sapphire, is a butterfly in the family Lycaenidae. It is found in Guinea, Sierra Leone, Liberia, Ivory Coast, Ghana, Togo, Nigeria (south and the Cross River loop), Cameroon and on Bioko. The habitat consists of forests.

The larvae feed on the flowers of Loranthus incanus.

References

External links

Die Gross-Schmetterlinge der Erde 13: Die Afrikanischen Tagfalter. Plate XIII 68 g

Butterflies described in 1893
Iolaus (butterfly)
Butterflies of Africa